Neivaviduthi is a village in the Pattukkottai taluk of Thanjavur district, Tamil Nadu, India.koiyala

Demographics 

As per the 2001 census, Neivaviduthi had a total population of 351 with 159 males and 192 females. The sex ratio was 1208. The literacy rate was 68.88.

References 

 

Villages in Thanjavur district